Jamia Mosque Sultania is a mosque (masjid) in Brierfield, Lancashire, England, UK. It is also the largest mosque in the ceremonial county of Lancashire.

History

The mosque was built in 2013 under the Mosque Membership of the local Muslim community and was completed at a cost of £2 million. The mosque also includes a dome and minaret like many traditional Islamic mosques and some of Lancashire's own mosques. Due to its elevated height, worship capacity and brickwork. It is claimed to be the largest mosque in Lancashire.

Facilities
The main prayer hall can accommodate approximately 2,000 worshippers.

Architecture
It is the newest purpose built mosque in the whole of Pendle.

See also
 Islam in the United Kingdom
 Islamic schools and branches
 List of mosques in the United Kingdom

References

External links
 Jamea Masjid Official website

Mosques in England
Religious buildings and structures in Lancashire
Religion in Lancashire
Mosques completed in 2013
Buildings and structures in the Borough of Pendle
Brierfield, Lancashire